Hyderabad - Purna Passengerr is a passenger train belonging to South Central Railway zone that runs between Hyderabad Deccan and Purna Junction. It is currently being operated with 57547/57548 train numbers on a daily basis.

Average speed and frequency 

The 57547/Hyderabad - Purna Passenger runs with an average speed of 33 km/h and completes 433 km in 13h 10m. The 57548/Purna - Hyderabad Passenger runs with an average speed of 34 km/h and completes 433 km in 12h 35m.

Route and halts 

The important halts of the train are:

Coach composite 

The train has standard ICF rakes with max speed of 110 kmph. The train consists of 12 coaches:

 10 General Unreserved
 2 Seating cum Luggage Rake

Traction

Both trains are hauled by a Moula Ali Loco Shed based WDG-3A diesel locomotive from Hyderabad to Purna and vice versa.

Rake Sharing 

The train shares its rake with 57549/57550 Hyderabad - Aurangabad Passenger.

Direction Reversal

Train Reverses its direction 1 times:

See also 

 Hyderabad Deccan railway station
 Purna Junction railway station
 Hyderabad - Aurangabad Passenger

Notes

References

External links 

 57547/Hyderabad - Purna Passenger
 57548/Purna Hyderabad Passenger

Transport in Hyderabad, India
Rail transport in Telangana
Rail transport in Karnataka
Rail transport in Maharashtra
Slow and fast passenger trains in India